Asplenium aequibasis is a species of fern in the family Aspleniaceae. It is found in Tristan da Cunha.  Its natural habitat is subantarctic shrubland.

References

aequibasis
Least concern plants
Flora of Tristan da Cunha
Taxonomy articles created by Polbot